Magnetic shield may refer to:
Magnetic shielding, material that blocks magnetic fields
Earth's magnetosphere